The 1993 Sonoma State Cossacks football team represented Sonoma State University as a member of the Northern California Athletic Conference (NCAC) during the 1993 NCAA Division II football season. Led by first-year head coach Frank Scalercio, Sonoma State compiled an overall record of 2–7 with a mark of 2–2 in conference play, tying for second place in the NCAC. The team was outscored by its opponents 308 to 193 for the season. The Cossacks played home games at Cossacks Stadium in Rohnert Park, California.

Schedule

Team players in the NFL
The following Sonoma State player was selected in the 1994 NFL Draft.

Notes

References

Sonoma State
Sonoma State Cossacks football seasons
Sonoma State Cossacks football